A May Chay Yar is a 1997 Burmese drama film, directed by Khin Maung Oo & Soe Thein Htut starring Dwe, Cho Pyone, May Than Nu and Honey Htun.

Cast
Dwe as Tin Maung Oo, Pho Ngo
Cho Pyone as Daw Cho Cho
May Than Nu as Pyae Pyae
Honey Htun as Honey, Ni Ma
Zaw Oo as U Kyaw Swar
Min Thu as Tin Maung Htwe, Nga Htwe
Pi Si as Aung Gyi
Saw Naing as Father of Pyae Pyae
Kaythumadi Myo Aung as U Thet Hnin

Awards

References

1997 films
1990s Burmese-language films
Burmese drama films
Films shot in Myanmar
1997 drama films